Thomas Jefferson High School (commonly referred to as Jefferson High School, Rockford Jefferson, or JHS) is a public coed four-year high school, in Rockford, Illinois, United States. The school serves the city of Rockford and the neighboring villages of Cherry Valley, Illinois and New Milford, Illinois. The school is named after the third President of the United States, Thomas Jefferson.

Athletics

Jefferson High School's mascot is the J-Hawk. The official school colors are red, white, and gold.

Jefferson High School is a member of the Northern Illinois Conference (NIC-10) and participates in state championship tournaments sanctioned by the Illinois High School Association (IHSA).

The following competitive teams won their respective IHSA sanctioned state championship tournament:

 Bowling (Boys): State Champion (2002–03)
 Bowling (Girls): State Champion (2007–08)

Activities

The following competitive teams won their respective IHSA sanctioned state championship tournament:

 Chess: State Champion (1990–91)
 Journalism: State Champion (2006–07)

Notable alumni

 Leonard Bell (1982) - defensive back, Cincinnati Bengals
 Chad Knaus (1989) - crew chief, Jimmie Johnson, NASCAR Sprint Cup Series champion
 Kathryn Layng (1978) - actress, Doogie Howser, M.D.

References

External links
 Official Thomas Jefferson High School Website
 Official Thomas Jefferson High School Alumni Association Website

Educational institutions established in 1969
High schools in Rockford, Illinois
Public high schools in Illinois
1969 establishments in Illinois